

Events calendar

External links

+02